Jürgen Graf (born 15 August 1951) is a Swiss author, former teacher and Holocaust denier. Since August 2000 he has been living in exile, and is currently living in Russia, working as a translator, with his wife.

Background
Born in Basel, Graf studied philology at the University of Basel; English, Romance and Scandinavian studies, and in 1979 completed his licentiate. Graf spent several years working as a school teacher teaching languages and later taught German at a Taipei school in Taiwan. On his return to Basel, he worked as interrogator of asylum seekers at the receiving agency on the repurposed Rhine cruise ship Basilea. He described his experiences in his 1990 book The Ship of Fools (Das Narrenschiff), over which he was accused of xenophobia. 

By the early 1990s, Graf was a convert to Holocaust denial, and was introduced to the field by his friend and retired school teacher Arthur Vogt through the works of Serge Thion, Arthur Butz and Wilhelm Stäglich. During the 1990s, Graf published several Holocaust denial works, his first titled The Holocaust on trial: Eyewitness accounts versus natural laws (Der Holocaust auf dem Prüfstand: Augenzeugenberichte versus Naturgesetze), several of his later books co-authored with the Italian Holocaust denier Carlo Mattogno. Graf distributed his book to journalists and parliamentarians, establishing a reputation as a Holocaust denier. As the result, he was dismissed from his teaching position; he was later employed in a private school in Basel, teaching German to foreign students. 

Graf's publications eventually led Swiss authorities to prosecute him for violating Swiss anti-racism laws. Graf and his then publisher, Gerhard Förster, were tried by a Swiss court in July 1998; Graf was sentenced to a substantial fine and 15-months imprisonment. He fled the country while awaiting his appeal, traveling through Poland, Russia, Ukraine and Turkey, ending in Iran, where a group of Iranian Holocaust deniers sheltered him in Tehran. Graf subsequently relocated to Moscow, Russia, where he met and married a Belarusian woman in 2001. He currently lives and works in Moscow as a translator.

References

External links
Official homepage

1951 births
Living people
Swiss expatriates in Russia
Swiss Holocaust deniers
Swiss exiles
Writers from Basel-Stadt
University of Basel alumni
Pseudohistorians